The Dadabhoy Institute of Higher Education (DIHE) is an educational institution in Karachi offering undergraduate, graduate and postgraduate education.

History
It was founded in 2000. It was awarded the university status after passage of The Dadabhoy Institute of Higher Education Act, 2004.

Degree programs
It offers degree programs in science, business education, law, computer science, and education.

References

Universities and colleges in Karachi
Academic institutions in Pakistan
2000 establishments in Pakistan